Geoclemys is a genus of turtle that contains a single living species, the black pond turtle (Geoclemys hamiltonii). Two fossil species are also known from the Miocene of Japan; Geoclemys matuuraensis and Geoclemys yudaensis.

References

Turtle genera
Reptile genera with one living species
Taxa named by John Edward Gray